Jabez Lamar Monroe Curry is a marble sculpture depicting the American politician and diplomat of the same name by Dante Sodini. The statue was gifted to the National Statuary Hall Collection from the state of Alabama in 1908, but was replaced by one depicting Helen Keller in 2009, and relocated to Samford University, where he had served as president from 1865 to 1868. In 2018, Samford returned the statue to the Alabama Department of Archives and History.

See also

 1908 in art

References

External links
 

1908 sculptures
Confederate States of America monuments and memorials in Washington, D.C.
Confederate States of America monuments and memorials in Alabama
Curry
Marble sculptures in the United States
Samford University
Sculptures of men in Alabama
Statues in Alabama